Zambia Orphans Aid UK (ZOA-UK) is a registered charity which 'finances community-based projects in Zambia that help orphans of AIDS and other vulnerable children to fulfil their potential.' The projects are selected and monitored by a sister organisation in Zambia, ZOA-Zambia.

The organization believes that 'every child has the right to an education', stated in a 2018 BBC Radio 4 appeal fronted by John Sergeant. ZOA observed in the broadcast that 'In Zambia, where there are over a million children who have lost one or both parents, many children are vulnerable to early marriage, sexual exploitation or child labour.'

ZOA therefore works with grassroots community groups to ensure children receive the care they need and can access the classroom, giving them vital skills that will help them to navigate a challenging world.

The ZOA-UK board of trustees includes several British Zambians and is headed by St Alban's-based Garnet Mulomo Garnet, himself born in Chingola, Zambia. On appointment to the role in 2021, Mulomo said that he is 'honoured to have been invited' to lead ZOA's response and praised the 'hands-on approach that the organisation takes'.

References

Charities based in the United Kingdom